Autumn is an album by trumpeter Don Ellis recorded in 1968 and released on the Columbia label.

Reception

Scott Yanow of Allmusic stated, the "Don Ellis' Orchestra is heard at the peak of its powers on this Columbia LP... This is a classic release".

Track listing 
All compositions by Don Ellis except as indicated
 "Variations for Trumpet" - 19:25    
 "Scratt and Fluggs" - 2:00    
 "Pussy Wiggle Stomp" - 6:43    
 "K.C. Blues" [live] (Charlie Parker) - 8:46    
 "Child of Ecstasy" - 3:16    
 "Indian Lady" [live] - 17:39

Personnel 
Don Ellis - trumpet, arranger
Glenn Stuart, Stu Blumberg, John Rosenberg, Bob Harmon - trumpet 
Ernie Carlson, Glenn Ferris - trombone 
Don Switzer, Terry Woodson - bass trombone 
Doug Bixby, Roger Bobo - tuba 
Ira Schulman - alto saxophone 
Frank Strozier - alto saxophone, clarinet 
Ron Starr - alto saxophone, flute, piccolo flute, soprano saxophone, clarinet 
Sam Falzone - tenor saxophone, soprano saxophone, flute, clarinet 
John Klemmer - tenor saxophone, clarinet 
John Magruder - baritone saxophone, clarinet, bass clarinet 
Pete Robinson - piano, clavinet, electric piano, prepared piano 
Mike Lang - piano, clavinet, electric piano
Ray Neapolitan, Dave Parlato - bass 
Ralph Humphrey - drums 
Gene Strimling - drums, percussion 
Lee Pastora - congas 
Mark Stevens - vibraphone, percussion

References 

Don Ellis albums
1968 albums
Columbia Records albums
Albums produced by Al Kooper